Leucopogon glacialis, the twisted beard-heath, is a species of flowering plant in the family Ericaceae and is endemic to south-eastern continental Australia. It is a spreading to erect shrub with narrowly egg-shaped to lance-shaped leaves, and crowded spikes of white flowers.

Description

Taxonomy
Leucopogon glacialis was first formally described in 1838 by John Lindley in Thomas Mitchell's journal, Three Expeditions into the interior of Eastern Australia. The specific epithet (glacialis) means "frozen".

Distribution and habitat
This leucopogon grows in heath and heathy woodland and is found mostly in the south-west of Victoria and the far south-east of South Australia.

References

glacialis
Ericales of Australia
Flora of South Australia
Flora of Victoria (Australia)
Plants described in 1838
Taxa named by John Lindley